William C. Galvin (born October 18, 1956, in Dorchester, Boston, Massachusetts) is an American insurance broker and politician who represents the 6th Norfolk District in the Massachusetts House of Representatives.

See also
 2019–2020 Massachusetts legislature
 2021–2022 Massachusetts legislature

References

1956 births
Democratic Party members of the Massachusetts House of Representatives
People from Canton, Massachusetts
Politicians from Boston
Framingham State University alumni
Suffolk University alumni
Living people
American businesspeople in insurance
21st-century American politicians